Sophron of Syracuse (fl. 430 BC) was a writer of mimes.

Sophron was the author of prose dialogues in the Doric dialect, containing both male and female characters, some serious, others humorous in style, and depicting scenes from the daily life of the Sicilian Greeks. Although in prose, they were regarded as poems; in any case they were not intended for stage representation. They were written in pithy and popular language, full of proverbs and colloquialisms.

Influence
Plato is said to have introduced Sophron's works into Athens and to have made use of them in his dialogues; according to Diogenes Laërtius, they were Plato's constant companions, and he even slept with them under his pillow; the Suda says of the mimes of Sophron, "Plato the philosopher always read them, so as to be sent into an occasional doze." Some idea of their general character may be gathered from the 2nd and 15th idylls of Theocritus, which are said to have been imitated from the Akestriai and Isthmiazousai of his Syracusan predecessor. Their influence is also to be traced in the satires of Persius.

Editions
The fragments of Sophron are collected by H. L. Ahrens, De graecae linguae dialectis (1843), ii. (app.), and C. J. Botzon (1867); see also his De Sophrone et Xenarcho mimographis (1856). J. H. Hordern's Sophron's Mimes: Text, Translation, and Commentary, Oxford, 2004, is the most recent edition.

References

Ancient Syracusans
Ancient Greek writers
5th-century BC Greek people
Old Comic poets
Doric Greek poets
Year of birth unknown
Year of death unknown